Cloezia is a  genus of flowering plants in the family Myrtaceae first described as a genus in 1863. The entire genus is endemic to New Caledonia. It is related to Thaleropia, Tristania and Xanthomyrtus.

Species
 Cloezia aquarum  
 Cloezia artensis  
 Cloezia buxifolia  
 Cloezia deplanchei  
 Cloezia floribunda  
 Cloezia × glaberrima

References

Myrtaceae genera
Endemic flora of New Caledonia
Taxa named by Adolphe-Théodore Brongniart
Taxa named by Jean Antoine Arthur Gris